The Conservatorio Profesional de Música de Getafe (Getafe Professional Conservatory of Music in English) is a public institution providing specialised pre-college education in Music located in Getafe, Madrid.

Studies
The conservatory offers the LOGSE basic and intermediate levels diplomas in music (Grado Elemental y Medio LOGSE). All the orchestral instruments, guitar, piano, accordion and saxophone are taught. These studies are to be taken alongside highschool studies, in order to obtain a diploma, which allows students to progress to a music college without having to pass theory, aural and history entrance exams.

Facilities
The conservatory has 49 teaching rooms and 18 practice rooms, library, computer room, large rooms for rehearsals and a 429-seats auditorium.

References

Music schools in Spain